Aepinus may refer to:
 Aepinus (crater) named after Franz Aepinus
 Aepinus (crab), a genus of crabs
 Franz Ulrich Theodor Aepinus (1724–1802), a German natural philosopher
 Johannes Aepinus (Johann Hoeck) (1499–1553), a German Protestant theologian